The Farnborough Airshow, officially the Farnborough International Airshow, is a trade exhibition for the aerospace and defence industries, where civilian and military aircraft are demonstrated to potential customers and investors. Since its first show in 1948, Farnborough has seen the debut of many famous planes, including the Vickers VC10, Concorde, the Eurofighter, the Airbus A380, and the Lockheed Martin F-35 Lightning II. At the 1958 show, the RAF's Black Arrows executed a 22-plane formation loop, setting a world record.

The international trade show is put together every two years by FIL Farnborough International Ltd. and runs for five days. Until 2020, the show ran for a full week with trade visitors attending on the first five days and the weekend reserved for the general public. Programming takes place at the Farnborough Airport, which lies roughly 50 kilometres south-west of London.

Status
The Farnborough International Airshow is the second-largest show of its kind after the Paris Air Show. It is a biennial week-long event to demonstrate civilian and military aircraft to potential customers and investors, and to announce new developments and orders.

The event is held in mid-July in even-numbered years at Farnborough Airport in Hampshire, United Kingdom. Flying occurs on all five days, and there are also static displays of aircraft outside and booths and stands in the indoor exhibition halls. The airshow alternates with the Paris Air Show, which is held in odd-numbered years and has a similar format, and is held in the same years as the Berlin Air Show. It is organised by Farnborough International Limited, a wholly owned subsidiary of ADS Group. In 2012, it attracted 109,000 trade visitors over the first five days, and 100,000 public visitors during the weekend. Orders and commitments for 758 aircraft were announced, worth US$72 billion.

History
The Society of British Aircraft Constructors held its first flying and static display at Hendon Aerodrome in June 1932. An invitation only flying display was held on 27 June 1932 and some of the aircraft were on static display in the "new aircraft park" during the previous weekend when the Royal Air Force pageant was held.

For the sixth annual display in 1936 the event moved to the nearby de Havilland airfield at Hatfield, the last before WWII occurred the next year.

The show recommenced in 1946 at Handley Page works at Radlett in north London until 1947.
In 1948, it moved to the Royal Aircraft Establishment field at Farnborough, Hampshire.

1940s

The inaugural show took place on the first week of September 1948. Among the aircraft on display was the large Armstrong Whitworth A.W.52 jet-powered flying wing.
The de Havilland Comet jet airliner was shown in 1949.
In 1950 the huge Bristol Brabazon airliner made its debut, powered by coupled Bristol Centaurus piston engines before the Bristol Proteus turboprops for longer ranges like London-New York nonstop.
A modified Vickers Viscount was shown with Rolls-Royce Tay turbojets in a configuration mimicked later by the Boeing 737.

1950s

In 1952, the futuristic Avro Vulcan delta bomber was displayed a few days after its first flight, along with the giant Saunders-Roe Princess double-decker flying boat powered by ten Proteus turboprops, one month after its maiden flight, but a de Havilland 110 disintegrated and crashed into the spectator area, killing 29 and its two crew.
In 1958, the Fairey Rotodyne was the star attraction, with its "tip-jet" powered rotors, transitioning from a helicopter vertical takeoff and hover to autogiro flight, exceeding helicopter speeds.

1960s

In 1962, the last time the show was held annually, the Hawker P.1127, the VTOL precursor to the Harrier jump jet, made its debut, along with the corporate de Havilland DH.125 Jet Dragon, and the de Havilland Comet 4C, de Havilland Trident, BAC 1-11 and Vickers VC10 airliners.
From 1966, foreign aircraft were allowed if they had British major components, such as the Rolls-Royce-powered Aermacchi MB-326 trainer and Fokker F27 turboprop airliner. Also, the Red Arrows, the RAF aerobatic display team, debuted their Hawker Siddeley Gnats.

1970s

In 1970, Concorde was shown after it had begun flight-testing the year before.
The double-delta Saab Viggen debuted in 1972 along with the Lockheed TriStar trijet widebody, powered by Rolls-Royce RB211s, in national British carrier BEA colours.
The Mach 3 Lockheed SR-71 Blackbird, and the C-5 Galaxy military airlifter, were shown in 1974. In 1978, the CASA C-101 was flown in the airshow after flight-testing earlier that same year.

1980s

In 1982, the civil aviation transatlantic rivalry was exemplified by the European Airbus A310 against the American Boeing 767 widebody twinjets, along with its narrowbody sibling, the Boeing 757, while the Rockwell B-1 large swing-wing bomber was the main military interest.
In 1984, to demonstrate its short landing, a de Havilland Canada Buffalo made a steep descent but hit the runway and disintegrated without a tragic outcome.
At the 1986 show were demonstrated the BAe EAP, the Eurofighter predecessor, and Dassault Rafale rival fighters, as an A300 fly-by-wire testbed flying at very high angles of attack showing the wind-shear stall protection capabilities, later equipping the A320.
In 1988, the GE36 propfan-powered McDonnell Douglas MD-80 was demonstrated as a precursor for the MD-94X but propfan airliners remain elusive, while the Soviet Union brought the giant Antonov An-124 Ruslan airlifter and two MiG-29 fighters.

1990s

The Eurofighter made its debut in 1996 in an air display showing its airborne capabilities. The Antonov An-225 Mriya also took flight in 1990.

2000s

The biggest passenger aircraft to ever appear at Farnborough, the Airbus A380 debuted with a flypast in 2006 while in the midst of its flight-test programme.

2010s

In 2012, a Boeing 787 Dreamliner from Qatar Airways was in flying display, after a Boeing absence for 13 air shows.
The Lockheed Martin F-35 Lightning II made its show debut in 2016, two years later than planned, with UK's first F-35B and two US Marine Corps examples.
In 2018, the UK Ministry of Defence unveiled a full-scale Tempest model for its Future Combat Air strategy, as the Mitsubishi MRJ regional jet made its first flying display.

End of the Public Show 
In March 2019 it was announced that the public flying days at the airshow would not continue. "Negative and vitriolic feedback" following the 2018 airshow, falling visitor numbers and tighter regulations introduced in the wake of the crash at Shoreham – which made it impossible for exhibitors such as the Red Arrows to perform aerobatics close to populated areas – were given as factors that contributed towards the decision. Farnborough would be a five-day trade show, with public admittance on the Friday only.

2020
The 2020 Farnborough Airshow was to take place on 20 to 24 July 2020, but it was cancelled for the first time in its 72-year history because of the COVID-19 pandemic; it was held online from 20 to 24 July (Farnborough International Airshow (FIA) Connect & Farnborough Friday).

Accidents  
On 6 September 1952, a DH.110 jet fighter disintegrated in flight and crashed into the crowd watching the airshow, killing 29 spectators and its pilot and navigator.

On 13 September 1964, a Bristol Bulldog G-ABBB, marked (incorrectly) as K2227 and owned by the Shuttleworth Trust, crashed while performing a loop – the pilot was only slightly hurt.

On 20 September 1968, a French Air Force Breguet Atlantic crashed into the offices of the Royal Aircraft Establishment (RAE) while performing a display at the air show.  One of the RAE's civilian maintenance staff was killed, as were all five members of the crew.

On 11 September 1970, a Wallis WA-117 autogyro G-AXAR crashed, killing the pilot, J. W. C. Judge.

On 1 September 1974, the Sikorsky S-67 Blackhawk helicopter prototype crashed on the runway after a low roll, killing both crew.

On 4 September 1984 a de Havilland Canada DHC-5D Buffalo crashed on the runway, with no casualties, after a badly judged steep approach to an intended short landing in a gusting crosswind.

Complementary information  
At the 1958 show, the Black Arrows executed a 22-plane formation loop. This remains a world record for the greatest number of aircraft looped in formation.

The show was initially an annual event, but has been biennial since 1962. It has become an international event that attracts exhibitors from all over the world – with the exception, during the Cold War, of countries aligned with the Soviet Union.

From 1996 the show has had its own official radio station operated by the staff and students of nearby Farnborough College of Technology, although it did not operate in 2012.

See also 
List of airshows

References

External links 

 
 Society of British Aerospace Companies official website
 Farnborough Airshow Coverage from Flightglobal
 Farnborough and the future of aviation by the Royal Geographical Society's Hidden Journeys project

Aviation in England
Airshows in the United Kingdom
Arms fairs
Farnborough, Hampshire
Science and technology in Hampshire
Military industry in the United Kingdom
Biennial events
20th-century establishments in England